Jakabaring Aquatic Center is a swimming, diving, and synchronised swimming venue of the 2011 Southeast Asian Games and canoe polo at the 2018 Asian Games. It lies inside the Jakabaring Sport City.

References

Jakabaring Sport City
Sports venues in Indonesia
Swimming venues in Indonesia
Swimming in Indonesia

Sports venues in Palembang